During the 2007–08 Spanish football season, Getafe competed in La Liga.

Season summary
For the second season running, Getafe were runners-up in the Copa del Rey; however, this time they failed to qualify for the UEFA Cup, as cup winners Valencia did not qualify for Europe for the league. Getafe had enjoyed a good run in the UEFA Cup, reaching the quarter-finals before knocked out on away goals by German giants Bayern Munich.

At the end of the season, manager Michael Laudrup tendered his resignation, having completed only one season with the team. Víctor Muñoz was appointed to replace him.

First-team squad
Squad at end of season

Left club during season

References

Getafe CF
Getafe CF seasons
2007–08 in Spanish football